Edith Conrad Halbert is an American physicist, elected a Fellow of the American Physical Society in 1972. She worked on computations in the nuclear shell model at the Oak Ridge National Laboratory.

Education
Halbert attended Cornell University, where she was elected to Sigma Xi and graduated with a bachelor's degree in 1951. She then went to the University of Rochester to pursue graduate studies in physics. At Rochester, she was the student of James Bruce French. She earned a doctorate in 1957 with a PhD thesis entitled A Shell Model for the Even-Parity States of Nitrogen-15.

Career
She worked at the Oak Ridge National Laboratory, where she directed the development of the Oak Ridge–Rochester Multi-Shell Program, a computer program used to compute the properties of atomic nuclei based on the nuclear shell model. While at Oak Ridge, she also worked as a visiting scientist in the low energy nuclear theory group at the Brookhaven National Laboratory and the nuclear theory group at Stony Brook University.

Personal life
Halbert came from a Forest Hills, New York family. She married Melvyn Halbert of Jamaica, New York, also a Cornell and University of Rochester physics student and later an Oak Ridge researcher.

Selected publications

References 

Living people
American physicists
American women physicists
Nuclear physicists
Cornell University alumni
University of Rochester alumni
Oak Ridge National Laboratory people
Fellows of the American Physical Society
1931 births
21st-century American women